Jennifer Allan may refer to:
Jennifer Lucy Allan, British musicologist
Jennifer Allan, 1996 Playboy Playmate
Jennifer Allan (married 1997), wife of Jonathan Soros

See also
Jennifer Allen, American author and commentator